Kellelo Justina Mafoso-Guni (born December 8, 1945 in Hlotse, Lesotho) is the first female lawyer in Lesotho, as well as a former justice of the African Court on Human and Peoples' Rights and the High Court of Lesotho (where she was the first woman on the Court).

Early life and education
Mafoso-Guni was born in Hlotse on December 8, 1945. She studied law at the University of Lesotho and the University of Edinburgh. She became the first female lawyer in Lesotho.

Career
Mafoso-Guni was appointed Crown Counsel in Lesotho in 1970. She then moved to the United Kingdom and worked in the civil serve for twelve years. She returned to Africa and was appointed magistrate in Zimbabwe on 28 September 1980, the first woman appointed to the bench. She served there for twelve years. Other sources have erroneously stated that Mavis Gibson was the first female judge in Zimbabwe's history. While Gibson did serve as a judge in Zimbabwe, she was actually the High Court of Namibia's first female judge.

Mafoso-Guni returned to Lesotho and was appointed to the High Court of Lesotho, again as the first female judge. In 2006, she was elected as one of the first judges of the African Court on Human and Peoples' Rights for a four-year term, one of two women alongside Sophia Akuffo.

Publications

Judicial writings
 Ntsapo Petlane (Born Makunya) v Mathe Petlane & Another (Duly assisted). CIV/APN/476/9825. August 1999
 R. Potoketsi v. Rex. CRI/A/22/98 . 15 February 1999
 African Oxygen Ltd v. Stm Marketing & Agencies Ltd & Another. CIV/APN/191/99, CIV/APN/270/99. 7 April 2000
 Ned Bank (Lesotho) Ltd v. Sotho Development Corporation (Pty) Ltd. CIV/T/450/99. 23 May 2000
 Rex v. Lisebo Mokhoro. CRI/T/39/96. 24 November 2000.
 Theresia Leoma v. Makhang Leoma. CIV/APN/465/99, CIV/APN/520/99. 8 August 2000

See also 
 List of first women lawyers and judges in Africa

References 

Judges of the African Court on Human and Peoples' Rights
1945 births
Living people
National University of Lesotho alumni
Alumni of the University of Edinburgh
Lesotho judges
Women judges
People from Leribe District
Lesotho judges of international courts and tribunals